The New York Tattoo Museum was a museum located at 203 Old Town Road in Staten Island's Old Town neighborhood above Dozer's shop. It was reported to be the first tattoo museum to open in New York City and housed mannequins displaying tattoo techniques, and other items from Dozer's collection. As of 2014, the museum was reported to have relocated to Medford, New York. and by 2017 it was reported to have closed.

See also
List of museums and cultural institutions in New York City

References

Art museums established in 2010
Museums in Staten Island
Tattooing
Art museums and galleries in New York City
2010 establishments in New York City
Defunct museums in New York City